Zhangzi County is a county in the southeast of Shanxi province, China. It is under the administration of the prefecture-level city of Changzhi.

Climate

References

External links
Official website of Zhangzi County Government

County-level divisions of Shanxi
Changzhi